OFW may stand for:
 Oberfeldwebel
 Open Firmware
 Organisationsforum Wirtschaftskongress
 Overseas Filipino Worker
 Overseas foreign worker
 Oxy-fuel welding